89.3 The Raven (89.3 FM) is a radio station in Edmonton, Alberta. Owned by the Aboriginal Multi-Media Society (AMMSA), it broadcasts programming targeting Central Alberta First Nations communities, with a primary classic rock format, and specialty shows like the 50's and 60's Retro Diner, Indigenous Music Countdown, Sunday Night Blues, and presented in Indigenous languages (Cree, Nakoda, Blackfoot, Dene.

History 
Following the collapse of the Aboriginal Voices Radio Network (which broadcast on 89.3 MHz in Edmonton as CKAV-FM-4), the CRTC pursued new applicants for indigenous radio stations to fill its frequencies. The Aboriginal Multi-Media Society, owner of the Edmonton-based indigenous network CFWE, was granted stations in Calgary and Edmonton. While the Calgary station would air a country format in the mold of CFWE, the proposed Edmonton outlet would be its opposite, playing "anything but country"—in the words of AMMSA founder Bert Crowfoot—as well as indigenous-language and indigenous music-oriented specialty programming.

AMMSA prioritized constructing the Calgary station, CJWE-FM, which went on air in April 2018. The wait would be nearly three years longer in Edmonton; CIWE had been planned to launch in April 2020, but the COVID-19 pandemic in Alberta prompted AMMSA to seek a one-year extension.

CIWE-FM began broadcasting February 1, 2021, after transmitter tests began January 11.

References

External links
 

IWE
IWE
Radio stations established in 2021
2021 establishments in Alberta